Slukat Learning Center is a volunteer non-profit foundation and school located in the village of Keramas, Gianyar Regency, Bali. Enrollment at the school is currently 150 children with ages ranging from 8 through to 18.

Origins 
Yayasan Slukat Learning Center is an official Indonesian non-profit foundation founded by Gusti Agung Rai and his family in 2007 for the children of Keramas village, with the first English classes taking place in December 2008.

The driving force behind Slukat Learning Centre is a Balinese family and their belief in the power of free education for all and a child's ability to reach beyond the norm with a little faith and support from others.

Mission 
The economy in Bali is dominated by tourism. In the future, most of the youth from the Gianyar Regency might seek work in the tourism industry, where English is required. Prior to Slukat offering free English classes, there was no free training for underprivileged youth of the area. The mission of Slukat is to develop character-building through self-confidence, local wisdom (culture), environment, compassion, integrity, and entrepreneurship. Slukat helps students develop their English language skills, and computer and communication techniques.

Programs 
Slukat has several programs for its students. Free English classes are provided to children to assist them in their ability for future development. Three levels of English curriculum are taught by international volunteer teachers.

For the Organic Program, an organic community garden has been created by the Clean & Green class to utilize compost and manure to grow sustainable local produce. All students of the center participate in maintaining and growing Slukat's garden, giving them the opportunity to understand the potential of fruit and vegetables.

In addition, Slukat has a recycling program, where the children's raised awareness from the Clean & Green class of the dangers of poor waste management to their heath, their village, and the environment as a whole drove them to establish a recycling station. All students  participate in the center's recycling bank, which rewards students via a point system on a monthly basis. Students now bring in excess of 100 kg of plastics to the center each month which would otherwise be burnt or discarded in local waterways.

Slukat Learning Center exists today due to the power of scholarships and founder Pak Agung Rai's desire to learn, propelling himself from the struggles of village life to the world's leading universities. Slukat now provides this opportunity to its dedicated students, giving them the potential to also have a first class international education.

Volunteers from abroad work as volunteers at the Center between two and 12 weeks, providing free English classes to the children of the area.

References 
 Bali Advertiser
 Bali Spirit

External links 
 
 Facebook: Yayasan Slukat Learning Center
 Travel to Teach at Slukat Learning Center
 http://denpasar.bpk.go.id/web/?p=1698
Foundations based in Indonesia
Educational organizations based in Indonesia